Tamara Ivanovna Tikhonova (born 13 June 1964) is a former Soviet Russian cross-country skier who competed from 1984 to 1992. She represented the Soviet Union at the 1988 Winter Olympics in Calgary, where she won three medals with golds in the 20 km freestyle and the 4 × 5 km relay, and a silver in the 5 km classical.

Tikhonova also won five medals for the Soviet Union at the FIS Nordic World Ski Championships with two golds (4 × 5 km relay: 1985, 1991), one silver (4 × 5 km relay: 1989), and two bronzes (10 km freestyle: 1989, 1991).

She was awarded Order of the Red Banner of Labour.

Cross-country skiing results
All results are sourced from the International Ski Federation (FIS).

Olympic Games
3 medals – (2 gold, 1 silver)

World Championships
 5 medals – (2 gold, 1 silver, 2 bronze)

World Cup

Individual podiums
2 victories
10 podiums

Team podiums
 5 victories
 8 podiums

References

External links

1964 births
Living people
Russian female cross-country skiers
Soviet female cross-country skiers
Olympic cross-country skiers of the Soviet Union
Olympic gold medalists for the Soviet Union
Olympic silver medalists for the Soviet Union
Cross-country skiers at the 1988 Winter Olympics
Olympic medalists in cross-country skiing
FIS Nordic World Ski Championships medalists in cross-country skiing

Medalists at the 1988 Winter Olympics
Universiade medalists in cross-country skiing
Universiade gold medalists for the Soviet Union
Competitors at the 1987 Winter Universiade